Robert John Kent (1835 – September 29, 1893) was an Irish-born lawyer and politician in Newfoundland. He represented St. John's East in the Newfoundland and Labrador House of Assembly from 1873 to 1886.

He was born in Waterford, the son of James Kent and Mary Carigan. He came to Newfoundland in 1856, working as a clerk for his uncle John Kent. Kent studied law with Hugh William Hoyles and was called to the bar in 1864. He entered practice with Joseph Ignatius Little in St. John's. In 1866, he married Ellen F. Donnelly. He was first elected to the assembly as a supporter of Charles James Fox Bennett. Kent's law firm represented the Newfoundland Railway Company. In 1884 and 1885, he defended 19 Catholics charged with murder following riots involving Orange and Catholic supporters in Harbour Grace. He was speaker for the Newfoundland assembly from 1883 until 1885, when Kent resigned as speaker after a Conservative-Liberal coalition broke up. He left politics in 1886. Kent also served as president of the Benevolent Irish Society from 1883 to 1891 and of the Law Society of Newfoundland from 1888 to 1893. He died in St. John's in 1893.

References 

Speakers of the Newfoundland and Labrador House of Assembly
1835 births
1893 deaths
Newfoundland Colony people
Irish emigrants to pre-Confederation Newfoundland